Andrew Christopher Teuten Ponzoni (born 20 July 1998) is a Uruguayan professional footballer who plays as a left-back for Argentine Primera División club Colón.

Early life
Teuten was born to an English father and an Uruguayan mother. He grew up in Montevideo and attended Ivy Thomas Memorial School in barrio Pocitos.

Career
After playing in the Uruguayan university league, Teuten signed for City Football Group owned club Montevideo City Torque in 2018. He made his professional debut on 28 March 2018 in a 1–1 draw against Boston River.

On 2 February 2022, Teuten was sold to Argentine Primera División club Colón for a fee around €445.000, signing a deal until the end of 2024.

Career statistics

Club

Honours
Montevideo City Torque
Uruguayan Segunda División: 2019

References

External links
 

1998 births
Living people
Footballers from Montevideo
Association football defenders
Uruguayan footballers
Uruguayan expatriate footballers
Uruguayan people of British descent
Montevideo City Torque players
Club Atlético Colón footballers
Uruguayan Primera División players
Uruguayan Segunda División players
Argentine Primera División players
Uruguayan expatriate sportspeople in Argentina
Expatriate footballers in Argentina
People educated at Ivy Thomas Memorial School